Onalcidion is a genus of beetles in the family Cerambycidae, containing the following species:

 Onalcidion antonkozlovi Monné, Nascimento, Monné & Santos-Silva, 2019
Onalcidion fibrosum Monné & Martins, 1976
Onalcidion lingafelteri Audureau, 2018
Onalcidion maculatum Vlasak & Santos-Silva, 2021
 Onalcidion obscurum Gilmour, 1957
 Onalcidion pictulum (White, 1855)
Onalcidion tavakiliani Audureau, 2013

References

Acanthocinini